Eliza Atkins Gleason Book Award is presented by the Library History Round Table of the American Library Association every third year to recognize the best book written in English in the field of library history, including the history of libraries, librarianship, and book culture.

The award is named after Eliza Atkins Gleason, the first African American to receive a Ph.D. from the Graduate Library School of the University of Chicago.

Recipients

External links
 Eliza Atkins Gleason Book Award
 American Library Association, Library History Round Table

References

American literary awards
English-language literary awards